The Sisters is a settlement in Victoria, Australia.  It is located about 38 km north east of Warrnambool and about 17 km northwest of Terang.

It was first settled in 1860. The name refers to two tuff rings of scoria cones and mounds in a cratered area of the zone. The tallest hill is 203 metres .  It consists of mostly dairy farms and had an old hall that was a school. The school was closed during the 1960s early 1970s.

Citations

References

  
 

Towns in Victoria (Australia)
1860 establishments in Australia